Luis Fernando Miranda Molinares (born 27 August 1997) is a Colombian footballer who plays as a right winger for Categoría Primera A side Deportes Tolima.

Club career

Cúcuta Deportivo
Getting his debut in the Categoría Primera B for Expreso Rojo in the 2015 season where he made 9 appearances during the year, Miranda joined Cúcuta Deportivo ahead of the 2017 season. He got his debut for the club on 5 March 2017 against Atlético FC, where he was in the line up, before getting replaced in the 64th minute. Miranda got his breakthrough in the 2018 season and became an important player for Cúcuta Deportivo.

Deportes Tolima
On 24 December 2019, Deportes Tolima confirmed the signing of Miranda.

International career
His performances for Cúcuta Deportivo in the 2019 season earned him a call-up from the Colombia Olympic football team in November 2019. He got his debut on 17 November 2019 when he came of the bench to play the last 22 minutes against Japan U23.

References

External links
 

Living people
1997 births
Association football wingers
Colombian footballers
Colombia youth international footballers
Categoría Primera A players
Categoría Primera B players
Tigres F.C. footballers
Cúcuta Deportivo footballers
Deportes Tolima footballers
People from La Guajira Department